Osro may refer to:

Osro Cobb (1904–1996), American lawyer, politician, and jurist
Osro, Kansas, unincorporated community, United States

See also
Khosrow (disambiguation)